Togo competed at the 2014 Winter Olympics in Sochi, Russia from 7 to 23 February 2014. Togo's team consisted of two athletes in two sports, marking the country's debut at the Winter Olympics.

Competitors

Alpine skiing 

According to the final quota allocation released on January 20, 2014, Togo had qualified one athlete. Alessia Afi Dipol is a naturalized Togolese and is originally from Italy. She has no familial connections to the country. She chose to represent the country because her father owns a clothing factory in Togo. On  February 18, Dipol finished the giant slalom race in 55th position (out of 74 competitors who finished). She did not finish the slalom race after starting the first run.

Cross-country skiing 

According to the final quota allocation released on January 20, 2014, Togo had one athlete in qualification position. Mathilde-Amivi Petitjean was born in Niger to a Togolese mother, which allowed her the opportunity to compete for the country. She was contacted by Togolese Ski Federation in March 2013 via Facebook to compete for the country at the Winter Olympics. Petitjean has lived the majority of her life in Haute-Savoie, France, where she learned to ski.

Petitjean finished in 68th place in her only race out of 75 competitors, nearly ten minutes behind the winner Justyna Kowalczyk of Poland. Petitjean hopes that her appearance will help to inspire the youth of Africa to participate in winter sports.

References

External links 
Togo at the 2014 Winter Olympics

Nations at the 2014 Winter Olympics
2014 Winter Olympics
Olympics